Cerovac is a village in the city of Kragujevac, Serbia and the district of Šumadija. According to the 2002 census, the village has a population of 904 people.  Between 2002 and 2008, Cerovac was part of the now-defunct Aerodrom urban municipality of Kragujevac.

An elementary school was founded in the last decade of the 19th century. The village has a church (Orthodox), a community  centre, hotels, shops and a market.

References

Kragujevac
Populated places in Šumadija District